The Thubten Dhargye Ling Buddhist Center is an American Tibetan Buddhist center founded by Geshe Gyeltsen in 1978.

The Thubten Dhargye Ling Buddhist Center was founded in 1978 by Geshe Gyeltsen at the "urging of his students," according to the Los Angeles Times. The center, which was originally located in Los Angeles, relocated to its present location in Long Beach, California, in 1996.

Geshe Gyeltsen died at the center in February 2009 at the age of 85.

References

External links
Thubten Dhargye Ling in Long Beach, California

Asian-American culture in California
Religious buildings and structures in Los Angeles County, California
Buildings and structures in Long Beach, California
Buddhist temples in California
Tibetan Buddhism in the United States